Dr. Saskia Estupiñán, a native of Quito, Ecuador, is a leading figure in international public health and oral health research. Dr. Estupinan has worked extensively with international organizations and has advised agencies including NASA, Kellogg Foundation and the World Bank.

A dentist and public health specialist who attended the Universidad Central in Quito and UCLA, Dr. Estupinan is best known for work with the World Health Organization and the Pan American Health Organization where she is the regional adviser on oral health.  She promotes the expansion of salt fluoridation.

Saskia Estupiñán is a track and field Master's athlete, ranked 2nd in the USA in the 80 meter hurdles among women in her age group in 2009.

References

Ecuadorian dentists
Women dentists
Living people
Ecuadorian masters athletes
UCLA School of Public Health alumni
Year of birth missing (living people)